The 1982 Commonwealth Games were held in Brisbane, Australia, from 30 September to 9 October 1982. The Opening Ceremony was held at the QEII Stadium (named after Elizabeth II), in the Brisbane suburb of Nathan. The QEII Stadium was also  the athletics and archery events venue. Other events were held at the purpose-built Sleeman Sports Complex in Chandler.

The Chairman of the 1982 Commonwealth Games was Sir Edward Williams.

The 1982 Commonwealth Games Logo was designed by Hugh Edwards, who was the winner of a nationwide competition held in 1978. The symbol is derived from the form of a bounding kangaroo. The three bands, forming stylized A's (for Australia), are in colours which are common to flags of many Commonwealth countries.

The mascot for the games was a cartoon kangaroo called Matilda. A 13-metre-high (42.65 feet) mechanical kangaroo travelled around the stadium and winked at the crowd.

The games were officially opened by The Duke of Edinburgh and closed by Elizabeth II.

Host selection
Bidding for the XII Commonwealth Games was held in Montreal, Canada, at the 1976 Montreal Summer Olympics. Lagos, Brisbane, Kuala Lumpur, and Birmingham were the bidding cities. On 14 July 1976, it was announced that Brisbane had won the rights to stage the Games after the other candidate cities withdrew bids earlier that year. Sixteen years after the Brisbane Games, Kuala Lumpur hosted the 1998 Commonwealth Games, while Birmingham hosted the 2022 Commonwealth Games.

Brisbane was awarded the Games by default after being the only Candidate City left at the bid election after Birmingham reversed its decision to submit an application. Nigeria's boycott of the Montreal Summer Olympics made Lagos' bid lobbying impractical. The Montreal Summer Olympics were plagued with cost overruns, and bidding on a sports festival anywhere in the world was not good politically.

Participating teams

Forty-six Commonwealth nations and territories took part in the 1982 Commonwealth Games. A total of 1,583 athletes and 571 officials participated in the event. The Griffith University student dormitories in Gold Coast was used as an athletes' village.

Sports
Sports contested during the 1982 Commonwealth Games included athletics, archery, badminton, lawn bowls, boxing, cycling, shooting, swimming, diving, weightlifting and wrestling.

Table tennis and Australian rules football were demonstration sports, with the latter being demonstrated at a 6 October rematch at the Gabba of that year's VFL Grand Final, which took place just 11 days before at the Melbourne Cricket Ground. Richmond won the demonstration rematch with a score of 28.16 (184) to Carlton's 26.10 (166).

Venues
Queen Elizabeth II Jubilee Sports Centre
Chandler Sports Complex:  Chandler Aquatic Centre – swimming and diving; Chandler Sports Hall – badminton and table tennis; Chandler Theatre – weightlifting; Chandler Velodrome – track cycling
Brisbane City Hall – wrestling
Brisbane Festival Hall – boxing
Belmont Rifle Range – shooting
Moorooka Bowls Club – lawn bowls
Murarrie Recreation Reserve – archery
Bruce Highway – road cycling
Brisbane River roads – marathon
Wynnum and Manly roads – 30 km walk
Woolloongabba Cricket Ground – Australian football demonstration
Athletes Village – Griffith University and Mount Gravatt College of Advanced Education.

Highlights

Opening ceremony (30 September)

The ceremony at the QEII Stadium was held on a fine but extremely windy day.  The wind was so strong that skydivers who were going to descend into the stadium were cancelled. Instead they made an entrance at the closing ceremony.

Day 1 (1 October)
The first event of the Games was  Road Trial in cycling. England won the Gold Medal in the event, and Australia won the Silver Medal—coming second to England by only six seconds.

Other sports which were contested on the first day of competition included swimming and diving, weightlifting, shooting and bowls.

Day 2 (2 October)
Sports contested included swimming, diving, weightlifting, shooting, cycling, bowls and archery.

The day was marred by both Australia and Canada being disqualified in the 4 × 100 metres relay in swimming, both problems occurring during change-overs. The medals awarded for this race went to England, Scotland and New Zealand.

Day 4 (4 October)
Sports contested included swimming, diving, cycling, athletics, archery, hammer throwing and shooting.

The day was marred when Canada was again disqualified, this time in the 4 × 200 metres freestyle relay. Canada protested against the winners, Australia, as well as against their own disqualification.

Closing ceremony

Elizabeth II closed the Games during a colourful ceremony, which included parachute jumpers (who had originally been also intended as part of the Opening Ceremony display) jumping and landing in a special target area within the stadium and red, white and blue balloons. Matilda the Kangaroo also winked at the Queen. Following the closing of the Games, the Queen and the Duke left the stand to be driven from the stadium. However, nobody wanted the Games to end and the Australian team formed a 'guard of honour' and ran beside and behind the car in which Queen Elizabeth and Prince Philip were travelling, as it circled the stadium several times before finally leaving. Team members from other countries also joined in running after the royal car.

Aboriginal movement protests 
The Brisbane Commonwealth Games were also noted by large-scale protests by the Aboriginal rights movement in Australia, which brought to the centre of international media attention the lack of Indigenous land rights in Australia, poor living condition and suppression of personal and political rights in Queensland in particular, and in Australia as a whole. One of the targets of the protests was Queensland's Aborigines Act 1971, which restricted and controlled the lives of Aboriginal people in Queensland.

There were large marches on 26 September (2,000 people), 20 September (1000), and a sit-in of 104 people on 4 October. Also on that day, around 20 spectators held Aboriginal flags in the stadium during the entire program. On 7 October, about 500 people attended another protest, and 400 police arrested 260 people, including then Governor-General's daughter, Ann Stephen. The protests were all peaceful, but police came out in force and blocked roads, making arrests under Queensland's Traffic Act.

Activists taking part in the protests included Gary Foley and Bob Weatherall (both leaders of the protest); Billy Craigie;  Lyall Munro Jnr; Ross Watson; Wayne Wharton; and Selwyn Johnson and his family. Selwyn's brother Hedley Johnson was a musician, of the Brisbane group Mop & the Dropouts. Their song, "Brisbane Blacks", written by Mop Conlon, became an kind of anthem for the protests.

Bob Weatherall, a Kamilaroi elder, is a lifelong activist, a researcher in Aboriginal history, and musical collaborator with Brisbane band Halfway

The protests, which were followed by large-scale arrests, are a significant event in the history of the Australian Aboriginal rights movement. When the Commonwealth Games returned to Australia in 2018 at the Gold Coast, it drew a series of peaceful protests.

Legacy 
In 2009 as part of the Q150 celebrations, the 1982 Commonwealth Games were announced as one of the Q150 Icons of Queensland for its role as a "Defining Moment". Brisbane also bid for the 1992 Summer Olympics but lost to Barcelona. Queensland Premier Annastacia Palaszczuk announced on 9 December 2019 that the state will make an official bid for the 2032 Summer Olympics featuring venues across Brisbane, Gold Coast and Sunshine Coast.

Medals by country
This is the full table of the medal count of the 1982 Commonwealth Games. These rankings sort by the number of gold medals earned by a country. The number of silvers is taken into consideration next and then the number of bronze. If, after the above, countries are still tied, equal ranking is given and they are listed alphabetically. This follows the system used by the IOC, IAAF and BBC.

Medals by event

Aquatics

Archery

Athletics

Badminton

Bowls

Boxing

Cycling

Diving

Shooting

Pistol

Rifle

Shotgun

Swimming

Weightlifting

Wrestling

See also
 World Expo 88, another international event held in Brisbane in the 1980s
 Commonwealth Games celebrated in Australia
 1938 Commonwealth Games – Sydney
 1962 Commonwealth Games – Perth
 2006 Commonwealth Games – Melbourne
 2018 Commonwealth Games – Gold Coast
 2026 Commonwealth Games – Victoria State
 Commonwealth Youth Games celebrated in Australia
 2004 Commonwealth Youth Games – Bendigo
 Olympic Games celebrated in Australia
 1956 Summer Olympics – Melbourne
 2000 Summer Olympics – Sydney
 Paralympic Games celebrated in Australia
 2000 Summer Paralympics – Sydney

References

Other sources
 "XII Commonwealth Games – The Official Pictorial History" —Channel 9 "Today Tonight", O & B Holdings Pty. Ltd., (1982)

External links
 Commonwealth Games Official Site
 1982 Commonwealth Games – Australian Commonwealth Games Association official website
 The whole world is watching- documentary on the Aboriginal Movement protests at the 1982 Commonwealth Games. State Library of Queensland
 People forming map of Australia Photographs - State Library of Queensland
 John Leslie Protest Photographs of 1982 Commonwealth Games - State Library of Queensland
 National black unity: rally & march: support land rights booklet - State Library of Queensland

 
Commonwealth Games
Commonwealth Games in Australia
Sports competitions in Brisbane
Commonwealth Games by year
Commonwealth Games
Commonwealth Games, 1982
Commonwealth Games
Commonwealth Games